Friend Zone (Friend Zone – ) is a 2018–2019 Thai television series starring Thanat Lowkhunsombat (Lee), Nichaphat Chatchaipholrat (Pearwah), Prachaya Ruangroj (Singto), Pronpiphat Pattanasettanon (Plustor), Nat Sakdatorn, Tipnaree Weerawatnodom (Namtan), Ratthanant Janyajirawong (Ter), Nathasit Kotimanuswanich (Best) and Sarunchana Apisamaimongkol (Aye).

Directed by Tidakorn Pookaothong and produced by GMMTV together with Trasher Bangkok, the series was one of the ten television series for 2018 showcased by GMMTV in their "Series X" event on 1 February 2018. It premiered on One31 and LINE TV on 11 November 2018, airing on Sundays at 22:00 ICT and 23:00 ICT, respectively. The series concluded on 2 February 2019.

On 20 April 2020, the series was rerun on GMM 25 airing on Mondays and Tuesdays at 22:45 ICT.

Cast and characters 
Below are the cast of the series:

Main 
 Thanat Lowkhunsombat (Lee) as Good 
 Nichaphat Chatchaipholrat (Pearwah) as Boyo
 Prachaya Ruangroj (Singto) as Earth
 Pronpiphat Pattanasettanon (Plustor) as Stud
 Nat Sakdatorn as Dr. Sam
 Tipnaree Weerawatnodom (Namtan) as Boom
 Ratthanant Janyajirawong (Ter) as Bern
 Nathasit Kotimanuswanich (Best) as Tor
 Sarunchana Apisamaimongkol (Aye) as Amm

Supporting 
 Way-Ar Sangngern (Joss) as Safe
 Chayapol Jutamat (AJ) as Ta
 Tosatid Darnkhuntod (Ten) as Arm
 Sutthipha Kongnawdee (Noon) as Ploypink
 Watchara Sukchum (Jennie) as Satang
 Natthaweeranuch Thongmee (Ja) as Pun
 Phakjira Kanrattanasood (Nanan) as Eve, Claire's sister
 Napasorn Weerayuttvilai (Puimek) as Claire, Good's ex-girlfriend
 Chaidi Dididi (Pattai) as Boyo's mother

Guest role 
 Pruk Panich (Zee) as Captain (Ep. 6 & 7)

Soundtrack

References

External links 
 Friend Zone on GMM 25 website 
 Friend Zone  on LINE TV
 GMMTV

Television series by GMMTV
Thai romantic fantasy television series
Thai drama television series
2018 Thai television series debuts
2019 Thai television series endings
One 31 original programming
Television series by Trasher Bangkok